Mvoti to Umzimkulu WMA, or Mvoti to Umzimkulu Water Management Area (coded: 11), Includes the following major rivers: the Mvoti River, uThongathi River, Mdloti River, Ohlanga River, Mngeni River, Sterkspruit River, Lovu River, Mkomazi River, Mzimayi River, Mzimkulu River and Mtamvuna River and covers the following Dams:

 Albert Falls Dam Mgeni River 
 Hazelmere Dam Mdloti River 
 Inanda Dam Mgeni River 
 Midmar Dam Mgeni River 
 Nagle Dam Mgeni River

Boundaries 
Primary drainage region U and tertiary drainage regions T40, T51 and T52.

References 

Hydrology

Water Management Areas
Dams in South Africa